Lyubomir Ivanov Panov (16 February 1933 – August 2022) was a Bulgarian basketball player. He competed in the men's tournament at the 1956 Summer Olympics, and the 1960 Summer Olympics.

References

External links

1933 births
2022 deaths
Bulgarian men's basketball players
1959 FIBA World Championship players
Olympic basketball players of Bulgaria
Basketball players at the 1956 Summer Olympics
Basketball players at the 1960 Summer Olympics
Sportspeople from Pleven